The Owl & Co (French: La Chouette et Cie) is a French series of CGI-animated episodes produced by Studio Hari for children's television, based on The Owl shorts.

Plot
The series features The Owl, the titular pink grumpy owl who resembles a plastic figure. The Owl lives in a forest inhabited by various other species, the most notable ones being an intelligent stickbug, a brash frog, a charismatic bat and an airheaded sheep. Like the original short series, the Owl does not care about anyone else around him, as he would rather eat a worm instead. However, the Owl usually is unlucky and goes through some slapstick scenarios. A running gag at the end of each episode is the fact the Owl ends up comically dismembered, usually accompanied by a short banjo tune.

List of episodes

Season 1 (2013)
01. Meteor-Owl
02. Owl-o-naut: Owl is sent as an astronaut to explore Mars after he hears his friends that its full of caterpillars.
03. Natur'owl Disaster
04. Owl Do Anything: Owl unintentionally destroys Chick's father's newly built home & he is forced to fix it, all while trying not to confess his crime.
05. Costume Dram'owl: Owl takes advantage of the gang's costume party, in order to use Sheep's caterpillar costume to trick the caterpillars into thinking he's one of them.
06. Guinea Pig Owl: When Owl is unintentionally fused with Stick Bug's pesticides, which causes him to give him a distaste for caterpillars, the gang try to fix him up, with various results.
07. Surprise Surprise Owl: During the night, Owl accidentally swallows an alien that produces multiple Easter eggs that are like Poké Balls. When one of them has a caterpillar in it, the owl is in a desperate rush to get ahold of it.
08. Magic Owl-Lamp
09. The Princess And The Fr'owl: A cursed frog princess arrives at the tree & Frog falls in love with her, but when he kisses her, she actually turns out to be a sheep, whom the latter then takes over.
10. Owl My Friends: Frog & Bat compete to see who has more friends than the other, & having everyone else having signed with their forms, they must allow the Owl to sign one of their forms in order to win.
11. Dirty Work But Some Owl Has To Do It: A mosquito keeps annoying the gang so they try to kill it.
12. Surrog'owl
13. Papparaz'owl
14. Trapper Owl
15. Spec'owl Species
16. Roy'owl Regime
17. Junk F'owl
18. Owl-O-Matic: The gang mistake Sheep's sleepy cousin for him, & try to wake him up by means of Stick Bug's latest invention, the Strengthner-Upper, to do so, while Owl uses a duplicate to catch caterpillars.
19. 'L' Plate Owl
20. Super Owl: Stick Bug creates a Gamma Ray Propulsion System that gives anyone superpowers, which turns Sheep into a superhero, which becomes a problem for Owl trying to catch caterpillars, so uses the machine on himself, & turns into a supervillain, due to Stick Bug busy trying to fix a component called the Mortality Condenser, causing an ultimate battle with Frog too, who is jealous of Sheep's superpowers.
21. H'owl And Seek
22 .Lottery Dr'owl
23. Horrib'owl Night
24. Fairy G'owl-Mother
25. Seeing Doub'owl
26. Circus Owl
27. Cuck'owl Clock
28. Owl In Wonderland: Owl finds a magic mirror that gets activated by stepping on a panel, & he & his friends enter a Wonderland-like world populated by caterpillars.
29. Pets-We-Owl
30. Owl Alone
31. Close Encounters Of the Owl Kind
32. Battle Roy'owl
33. Loch Owl Monster
34. Pirates Of The Carib'owl
35. Vegetab'owl
36. Dracul'owl
37. The Return of Tutakham'owl
38. Midnight Phant'owl
39. Seag'owl Surprise: Owl meets Sheep's friend Seagull, who turns out to be too good at his job of massaging.
40. Radio Contr'owl
41. Slinky As A Sn'owl
42. Hypn'owl
43. Excalib'owl
44. Me Tarzan, You Owl
45. Diffic'owl Day
46. Bad Tempered Owl!
47. Immoveab'owl
48. G'owlty
49. Adopt A Owl
50. Vide'owl
51. Fun'owl Business
52. You Are My Lucky Owl!: Owl finds a lucky charm in Flamingo's postage bag of luck charms, which is then taken by Sheep, & he, Frog, & Stick Bug, plot to get it.
53. Bubble Gum Owl
54. Little Red Riding Owl: Owl accompanies Sheep on his way to his grandma's house, but their plans go awry when Badger tries to take away their antique books.
Paranowlmal Activity
Cont'owlgion
Tinowl
Leprechowl
Swiss Family Owl'binson
Deep Sea Dive Owl
The Philosopher's Owl
South P'owl
My Good Friend Owl
Abracad'owl
Owl'iday on Ice
Hoseowl
The Owl'th Samurai
Blow Up Owl
Magic Owl
Rock'n'owl
Tidy Up Owl
Night Owl
Santa Cl'owl
Abominabowl Snowman
Holy Owl!
Invisib'owl: The gang come across a mushroom that turns anything that touches it invisible, & an affected animal to pass on the effect by biting an object. A caterpillar falls victim to it, which then passes it to Owl, causing trouble.
Gastro'owl
Termin'owl

Season 2 (2015)
Owlception
Gravowlity
Festowlities
Owlanderthal
Owlsteroid
Winning towleam
Owlsterious creature
Inca owlecy
Eternowl love
The royowl sceptre
Owlagic trick
Pinochiowl
Owlspies
The lady and owlicorn
Owl Thumb
Peowler Pan
The owltrange adventure of Dr Stick
Owl's teeth
Royowl visit
Owl and the magic caterpillar
The gowld rush
The curse of Owltankhamun
Hallowleen
Emowljis
Mowlgic potion
The league of the vigowlantes
Belle-Owl en Mer
Owlnesia
Episode 29
Episode 30
Episode 31
Episode 32
Jowlney to the centre of the Earth
Owlectric caterpillars
Private owltective
Complications with caterpillars
Episode 37
Episode 38
Episode 39
Episode 40
Episode 41
Episode 42
Episode 43
Episode 44
Episode 45
Episode 46
Episode 47
Episode 48
Episode 49
Episode 50
Episode 51
Episode 52
Episode 53
Episode 54
Episode 55
Episode 56
Episode 57
Episode 58
Episode 59
Episode 60
Episode 61
Episode 62
Episode 63
Episode 64
Episode 65
Episode 66
Episode 67
Episode 68
Episode 69
Episode 70
Episode 71
Episode 72
Episode 73
Episode 74
Episode 75
Episode 76
Episode 77
Episode 78

Broadcast
The Owl & Co made its French debut on France 3 in 2013. The series made its English debut on Boomerang UK on 2 May 2015. It ended on 5 November 2016.

The series' English dub also aired internationally for some amount of time, one of them being Disney Channel Asia. It also launched in India on Sony YAY! in September 19, 2022 with a different name i.e. ''Dhakki Chiki Aaool!

Awards and nominations
 Pulcinella Award 2015 - Best Kids TV series - Cartoons on the bay, Venise.

References

External links 
 Official Website

French computer-animated television series
2010s French animated television series
Computer-animated television series
French children's animated adventure television series
French children's animated comedy television series
Fictional owls
Animated television series about birds
Animated television series without speech